The 2021–22 Incarnate Word Cardinals women's basketball team represented the University of the Incarnate Word in the 2021–22 NCAA Division I women's basketball season. The Cardinals were led by coach Jeff Dow, in his third season, and are members of the Southland Conference. The Cardinals play their home games at the McDermott Center on campus in San Antonio, Texas. They finished the season 12–16, 5–9 in Southland play to finish tied in sixth place. In the Southland women's tournament they upset Southeastern Louisiana University to win the championship and gain an automatic berth in the 2022 NCAA Division I women's basketball tournament

Previous season

Roster
Sources:

Schedule
Sources:

|-
!colspan=6 style=|Non-conference regular season
|-

|-
!colspan=6 style=|Southland regular season

|-
!colspan=9 style=| Southland Tournament
|-

|-
!colspan=9 style=| NCAA tournament
|-

See also
2021–22 Incarnate Word Cardinals men's basketball team

References

Incarnate Word
Incarnate Word Cardinals women's basketball seasons
Incarnate Word
Incarnate Word
Incarnate Word